Saul is a village in County Down, Northern Ireland, within the civil parish of Saul and Ballee.

The villages lies to the east of Downpatrick and has strong links with Saint Patrick. It is claimed that when Saint Patrick arrived in Ireland in 432, strong currents swept his boat through the Strangford Lough tidal narrows and he landed where the Slaney River flows into the lough. The local chieftain, Dichu, was converted and gave him a barn (Old Irish saball, hence the placename) for holding services. Allegedly, Saint Patrick died in Saul Monastery on 17 March 461 and is buried in nearby Downpatrick. The modern "Saint Patrick's Memorial Church" is built on the reputed spot of this building and includes a replica round tower.

Saul has expanded closer into Downpatrick with new estates being built such as Saul Meadows, Saul Acres and Saul Manor. The village has a soccer club and Gaelic football club St Patrick's GAC, formed in 1928.

Civil parish of Saul
The civil parish is in the historic barony of Lecale Lower and contains the following settlements:
Saul

Townlands
The civil parish contains the following townlands:

Ballinarry
Ballintogher
Ballynagarrick
Ballysugagh
Ballywoodan
Carrowcarlin
Carrowvanny
Castle Island
Gores Island
Green Island
Hare Island
Launches Little Island
Launches Long Island
Lisbane
Lisboy
Portloughan
Quoile
Ringbane
Russells Quarter North
Russells Quarter South
Salt Island
Saul
Shark Island
Walshestown
Whitehills

See also
List of towns and villages in Northern Ireland
List of civil parishes of County Down

References

External links 

Townlands of County Down